The scholarships in Taiwan include scholarships for pursuing degrees (bachelor, master or PhD), academic exchange, conducting research, learning Mandarin and experiencing culture in Taiwan. They are mostly funded by the Taiwanese government, universities and Academia Sinica, but also by non-profit foundations.

Overview 
The Taiwan Fellowships & Scholarships (TAFS) program is a joint governmental initiative (Ministry of Science and Technology, Ministry of Foreign Affairs (MOFA), Ministry of Education (MOE), Ministry of Culture and Ministry of Economic Affairs) aimed to promote exchange and friendships between Taiwan and the global community. The TAFS comprises awards in three categories: scholarships for Degree, fellowships for research and Huayu (Mandarin) Enrichment Scholarships. Approximately 1,250 TAFS grants are provided annually for undergraduate and postgraduate students as well as researchers across the world to study or to conduct advanced research in Taiwan.

Bachelor and master degrees

PhD degrees

Taiwan International Graduate Program 
Taiwan International Graduate Program (TIGP) is an English-language PhD program at Academia Sinica, Taiwan's foremost research institute for life sciences, physical sciences, humanities and social sciences. In the year 2016, there were 57 TIGP graduates and as of December, 2016, 537 students from 44 countries were enrolled in TIGP

Taiwan Scholarship 
In addition to bachelor's and master's degrees, the MOFA and MOE Taiwan Scholarships from the Taiwanese government are also available for PhD programs.

University scholarships 
Some universities provide their own scholarships for international students.

Short-term exchange 
Fellowships are available for researchers from all fields. Some, however, are limited to only Taiwan studies and sinology. The TIGP International Internship Program is available for two-month research stay in Academia Sinica.

Learning Mandarin 
Huayu Enrichment Scholarship is provided on a competitive basis to foreigners who want to learn the Mandarin language in one of the Mandarin study centers in Taiwan such as the Mandarin Training Center.

In 2021, the Hanyu BEST Program is provided for top selected Mandarin study centers in Taiwan to establish oversea Mandarin centers with partner university such as Chinese Language Center (CLC) of National Dong Hwa University (NDHU), which established Mandarin centers in Howard University and Oakland University.

See also 

Huayu Enrichment Scholarship
Taiwan Scholarship
Academia Sinica#Education programs

References

External links
Taiwan Fellowships and Scholarships (TAFS)
Taiwan Academy
Study in Taiwan
Scholarships, Ministry of Education, Taiwan
Foundation for International Cooperation In Higher Education of Taiwan

 
Student exchange